Scott Pera (born August 27, 1967) is an American college basketball coach and current head coach for the Rice Owls men's basketball team.

Coaching career
Pera started his coaching career at Elizabethtown College in 1992, before embarking on a high school coaching career in Pennsylvania and California, most notably Artesia High School, where he coached James Harden. In his high school coaching career, Pera compiled a 258–65 record.

In the college ranks, Pera joined Herb Sendek's staff at Arizona State, where he began as the director of basketball operations before being elevated to assistant coach. From 2012 to 2014, Pera was an assistant coach at Penn under Jerome Allen. In 2014, he joined Mike Rhoades's staff at Rice, and when Rhoades left for VCU, Pera was elevated to the head coaching position to be the 25th coach in Owls history.

Head coaching record

College

References

External links
 Rice profile

1967 births
Living people
American men's basketball coaches
Arizona State Sun Devils men's basketball coaches
Basketball coaches from Pennsylvania
High school basketball coaches in the United States
Penn Quakers men's basketball coaches
People from Hershey, Pennsylvania
Rice Owls men's basketball coaches